Melanoplus viridipes, the Green-legged Locust, is a species of spur-throated grasshopper in the family Acrididae. It is found in North America.

References

Melanoplinae